Robby Foley (born July 20, 1996) is an American racing driver who currently competes in the WeatherTech SportsCar Championship.

Career

Raised in Randolph, New Jersey, Foley's motorsports career was kickstarted in 2010 by a severe injury sustained during a football game while attending Randolph High School, which included a torn LCL, ACL, PCL, and a broken tibia, fibula, and ankle, alongside nerve damage, leading to a consideration by his physicians of amputating the affected leg. The following year, Foley attended the Skip Barber Racing School. After winning the Skip Barber class of the 2015 Global MX-5 Cup, Foley was granted a $100,000 scholarship by Mazda, leading to a full season campaign with Atlanta Motorsports Group in 2016. Following several seasons in MX-5 Cup competition, Foley moved into the IMSA SportsCar Championship with Turner Motorsport in 2018, making his debut at Belle Isle in June. The following season, Foley began racing full-time with the team. Foley scored his first IMSA victory at Canadian Tire Motorsports Park in July 2019. In 2020, Foley won his first official championship, winning the Pro-Am class of the GT4 America SprintX Series with co-driver Michael Dinan. The following year, Foley made his debut at the 24 Hours of Le Mans, driving for Team Project 1.

For 2022, Foley returned for another full season with Turner Motorsport and co-driver Bill Auberlen, driving the new-for-2022 BMW M4 GT3. The duo would claim their only class victory of the season at Mid-Ohio, and tallied four total podiums to finish fourth in the GTD-class championship. During 2022, Foley also embarked on full-season campaigns in the GT World Challenge America and Michelin Pilot Challenge. Paired with Michael Dinan in the former championship, the team scored Pro-cclass victories at Watkins Glen and in the Indianapolis 8 Hour, where they finished as the highest entry eligible for GT World Challenge America points; third overall. In the latter series, Foley and co-driver Vin Barletta finished seventh in the GS-class championship, placing as high as fourth at Laguna Seca and VIR. Foley also took part in the 2022 24 Hours of Spa, driving for Walkenhorst Motorsport in a Turner-inspired BMW M4 GT3.

Foley returned to Turner Motorsport in 2023, once again taking part in the IMSA SportsCar Championship and Michelin Pilot Challenge. Just prior to the 2023 24 Hours of Daytona, Foley was named as one of BMW North America's contracted drivers.

Racing record

Career summary

Complete WeatherTech SportsCar Championship results
(key) (Races in bold indicate pole position)

* Season still in progress.

Complete FIA World Endurance Championship results
(key) (Races in bold indicate pole position; races in italics indicate fastest lap)

Complete 24 Hours of Le Mans results

References

External links
Robby Foley at Bell Racing
Robby Foley at Motorsport.com
Robby Foley at Racing Reference

1996 births
Living people
American racing drivers
24 Hours of Daytona drivers
WeatherTech SportsCar Championship drivers
Racing drivers from New Jersey
People from Randolph, New Jersey
Randolph High School (New Jersey) alumni
Sportspeople from Morris County, New Jersey
International GT Open drivers
FIA World Endurance Championship drivers
24 Hours of Le Mans drivers
24H Series drivers
GT World Challenge America drivers
Michelin Pilot Challenge drivers